John Alfred Pickler (January 24, 1844 - June 13, 1910) was an American politician. He served as a member of the United States House of Representatives.

Biography
Pickler was born in Salem, Indiana, and moved to Davis County, Iowa in his youth. He attended public schools in Davis and enlisted in the 3rd Iowa Cavalry Regiment during the American Civil War. He was promoted to the rank of major by the end of the war.

He graduated from the University of Iowa in 1870, attended the Old University of Chicago Law School in 1871 and graduated from the law school at the University of Michigan in 1872. He was admitted to the bar in 1872 and began practicing law in Kirksville, Missouri.

The Maj. John A. Pickler Homestead is on the National Register of Historic Places.

Career
Pickler was a Republican politician. He was elected district attorney of Adair County, Missouri in 1872. He moved to Muscatine, Iowa and served in the Iowa House of Representatives from 1881 to 1883. He moved to the Dakota Territory and served in the territorial legislature in 1884. While serving in the Dakota Legislature, he played a key role in introducing the territory's first bill to give women the right to vote.

After South Dakota was admitted as a state, he was elected as a Republican to Seat A, one of South Dakota's at-large seats in the United States House of Representatives.  He was reelected in 1890, 1892, and 1894, and served from November 2, 1889 to March 3, 1897. Pickler and his wife, Alice Alt Pickler, worked for women's suffrage in the state. In his final term he was chairman of the Committee on Invalid Pensions. He chose not to run for re-election in 1896.

After leaving Congress, Pickler resumed the practice of law, and also became active in the real estate business.

Death
Pickler died on June 13, 1910 in Faulkton, South Dakota at the age of sixty-six. He is interred at Faulkton Cemetery in Faulkton.

References

External links
 
 
 
 John Pickler at GovTrack.us

1844 births
1910 deaths
Members of the Iowa House of Representatives
Members of the Dakota Territorial Legislature
People from Salem, Indiana
University of Chicago Law School alumni
University of Michigan Law School alumni
Republican Party members of the United States House of Representatives from South Dakota
People from Davis County, Iowa
19th-century American politicians
People from Faulkton, South Dakota
South Dakota suffrage
American suffragists